A siesta is a short nap taken in the early afternoon, often after the midday meal.

Siesta may also refer to:

Siesta (film), directed by Mary Lambert
SIESTA (computer program), an ab-initio materials simulation software
Prince Polo, a chocolate bar also sold under the name Siesta 
Siesta (poem), a poem by Shampa Sinha

Places
Siesta Key, Florida
Siesta Beach, Florida
Siesta Shores, Texas

See also
The Siesta (disambiguation)